Charles Brown (22 January 1815 – 28 September 1875) was an English first-class cricketer active 1861 who played for Nottingham and Nottinghamshire as a wicketkeeper. He was born and died in Nottingham.

References

1815 births
1875 deaths
English cricketers
Nottinghamshire cricketers
North v South cricketers
Non-international England cricketers
Players of Nottinghamshire cricketers
Nottingham Cricket Club cricketers